A line house is a building deliberately located so that an international boundary passes through it.  One such building on the boundary between the United States and Canada is the Haskell Free Library and Opera House in Stanstead, Quebec, and Derby Line, Vermont. The border is marked on the floor in a reading room and an auditorium. A number of single-family residences and some industrial buildings straddle the boundary in those two towns.  

The International Boundary Commission encourages line houses to be abandoned as part of its mandate to clearly demarcate the Canada–US border. The Haskell Free Library and most other line houses are on the Collins–Valentine line between Quebec and New York/Vermont.

Line houses exist also in Baarle-Hertog on the border between Belgium and the Netherlands.

The border between the United Kingdom and the Republic of Ireland passes through many houses and other buildings.

In Sungai Haji Kuning at Sebatik Island, which is divided between Malaysia and Indonesia, there is a house divided by the countries' borders.

Paul VI Audience Hall in Rome lies partially in the Vatican City but mostly in Italy: the Italian part of the building is treated as an extraterritorial area of the Holy See and is used by the Pope as an alternative to Saint Peter's Square when conducting his Wednesday morning General Audience.

See also 
 Joint Security Area
 Demilitarized zone

References 

Buildings and structures by type
Borders